Candice Ann Warner (née Falzon) is a retired Australian professional ironwoman and surf life saver.

Ironwoman 

Warner first competed professionally at the age of 14 in the Ironman series. At 16 she was a NSW state ironwoman champion. In January 2008 Warner qualified for a spot in the 2008 Nutri-Grain Ironman & Ironwoman Series.

Television appearances
Warner appeared on the 2008 series of It Takes Two, supporting the Beyond Blue charity but was eliminated sixth on 1 April 2008. Her mentor was Anthony Callea.

She was the subject of the Australian Story program on 9 June 2008.

In 2017, Warner appeared as a celebrity contestant on the Australian version of Hell's Kitchen. She came in tenth place, the first one eliminated.

In 2020, it was announced Warner would be participating the Seven Network's reality program SAS Australia: Who Dares Wins.

Personal life

Warner was born in Sydney, in the suburb of Maroubra. Warner is of Maltese heritage. She is the wife of Australian cricketer David Warner since 2015. They had their first child (a daughter), Ivy Mae on 11 September 2014 and a second daughter, Indi Rae on 14 January 2016 and a third daughter Isla Rose born on 30 June 2019. They live in Sydney.

She was previously in a brief relationship with British comedian David Walliams. She is also known for a sexual encounter with rugby superstar Sonny Bill Williams. In 2007, she was captured on a mobile phone camera with Williams at the Clovelly Hotel. She was seen with another Bulldogs player, Ben Roberts, at a Kings Cross nightclub three hours afterwards.

References

External links

1985 births
Living people
Australian female models
Models from Sydney
Australian surf lifesavers
Australian people of Maltese descent
Australian female swimmers
Participants in Australian reality television series